In 1896, the government of Madras passed the Malabar Marriage Act in response to the recommendations of the Malabar Marriage Commission of 1891. This allowed members of any caste practising marumakkatayam (matriliny) in Malabar to register a sambandham as a marriage. It was permissive rather than restrictive law: whether or not a relationship was registered was entirely the decision of the people involved in that relationship.

Initiated by the work of Sir C. Sankaran Nair, the measure was largely a failure, with Panikkar noting that in the 20 years following introduction of the Act only six such relationships were registered and that all of those involved family members of Nair himself.

Sambandham and marumakkatayam

Sambandham was a form of relationship practiced by the Nair caste. Anthropologist Christopher Fuller has said that, "The Nayars' marriage system has made them one of the most famous of all communities in anthropological circles". Thomas Nossiter has commented that their system, which included the pre-pubertal thalikettu kalyanam rite and permitted both hypergamy and a form of polyandry, "was so loosely arranged as to raise doubts as to whether 'marriage' existed at all." Men and women could both have several partners, and they could both break away from those partners and take other partners with a minimum of effort.

The sambandham relationship was not recognised by the British colonial government, who saw it as akin to concubinage. The civil courts refused jurisdiction, principally because the relationship could so easily be dissolved by either party to it and because there were no rights of property connected to it. Marumakkatayam was also a source of angst among the colonial administrators. Expressions of dissatisfaction with marumakkatayam became prominent in newspapers of the 1870s and 1880s, and were also voiced by the colonial administrator William Logan in an official report of that period. Matters came to a head in 1890 when Nair introduced a bill seeking legitimisation of the customs in the Madras Legislative Council, causing the administration to establish the Malabar Marriage Commission in 1891. This was to investigate matrilineal customs and was also charged with recommending whether or not legal measures should be used to effect changes to the traditional practices for marriage, family organisation and inheritance.

References

1896 in India
Kerala state legislation
Indian family law
Social history of India
Marriage law in India